The Toronto Beaches are a Junior "A" box lacrosse team from Toronto, Ontario, Canada.  The Beaches 
formally played in the OLA Junior A Lacrosse League. They are named after The Beaches, an east-end Toronto neighbourhood.

Season-by-season results
Note: GP = Games played, W = Wins, L = Losses, T = Ties, Pts = Points, GF = Goals for, GA = Goals against

External links
Beaches Webpage
The Bible of Lacrosse
Unofficial OLA Page

Ontario Lacrosse Association teams
Be